Fortis Football Club is a Bangladeshi football club based in Badda, Dhaka. They compete in the Bangladesh Premier League, the top flight of Bangladesh football, having gained promotion as the 2021–22 Bangladesh Championship League champion. Despite being a Dhaka based club, the club gives priority to players from Chittagong Division as majority of its owners are from the port city.

History

Journey to the top flight 
In 2020, Fortis Group established Fortis FC as part of their football development project, the club president Shahin Hasan stated that the club's main purpose is to establish academies all around the country in order to create a pipeline of future international players. Before its league journey set about, the club established the Fortis FC Academy. On 4 February 2020, Bangladesh Football Federation gave the green signal for the club to directly enter the Bangladesh Championship League, without having to play through the lower divisions in Dhaka.

Before the start of the 2020–21 Championship League season, Fortis completed the signings of 10 players with premier league experience. Notable among them were Khan Mohammad Tara, Uttam Barua and former national team striker Towhidul Alam Towhid. They also appointed head-coach Akbor Hossain Ridon, who previously won the 2019 BFF U-18 Tournament with NoFeL SC. On 8 February 2021, Fortis FC began their professional league journey as they drew 0–0 against Farashganj SC in the opening day of the new league season. On 1 March 2021, the club registered their first ever victory, by defeating  Dhaka Wanderers 3–2 as, striker Mohammad Hasanuzzaman registered the club's first-ever professional league goal. During their debut season, Fortis finished in third place and were only 2 points off from the top spot.

Before the start of the  2021–22 Championship League, president Shahin Hasan informed that the club recruited players from the then ongoing Chittagong League, and only retained 15 players from their previous campaign. Jahidur Rahman Milon was appointed as the new head coach and former senior national team defender Atiqur Rahman Meshu was added to the club's coaching staff as an assistant coach. On 24 April 2022, Fortis recorded a goalless draw against newcomers Azampur FC, which meant that the club were unbeaten in their previous 31 league games. On 1 June 2022, Fortis secured promotion to the Bangladesh Premier League with two games to go, thrashing Kawran Bazar 5–0, with forward Mohammad Hasanuzzaman scoring a hattrick. Fortis finished the league season with the least goals conceded, and veteran keeper Uttam Barua topped the cleansheet charts.

Premier League era
On 19 March 2022, Fortis FC initiated their 2022–23 Bangladesh Premier League campaign as they registered a 1–1 draw against the reigning 2nd place-holders Abahani Limited Dhaka.

Shirt sponsors

Current squad

Reserves and academy

Personnel

Current technical staff

Team records

Head coaches' record

Management

Board of directors

Competitive record

Honours

League
 Bangladesh Championship League
Winners (1): 2021–22

References

Association football clubs established in 2020
Sport in Dhaka
Football clubs in Bangladesh
2020 establishments in Bangladesh